Mylothris sjostedti, Sjoestedt's dotted border, is a butterfly in the family Pieridae. It is found in Nigeria, Cameroon, the Democratic Republic of the Congo, Uganda, Burundi and Tanzania. The habitat consists of forests. The name honours Bror Yngve Sjöstedt.

Subspecies
Mylothris sjostedti sjostedti (Nigeria, Cameroon, Democratic Republic of the Congo)
Mylothris sjostedti hecqui Berger, 1952 (Democratic Republic of the Congo, Uganda, Burundi, north-western Tanzania)

References

Seitz, A. Die Gross-Schmetterlinge der Erde 13: Die Afrikanischen Tagfalter. Plate XIII 11

Butterflies described in 1895
Pierini
Butterflies of Africa